Dhok Mughal Pathaan is a  village in the Jhelum District of Punjab, Pakistan.

The history of this village dates back to around 300 years ago, when two brothers from Afghanistan migrated to Punjab.  The name of the village reflects the background of the 2 brothers, who were of Pathaan origin and settled in an area of Mughal majority. According to village elders, the village is in its 7th generation.

Occupation of locals

The majority of the people from this village are either abroad (UK, U.A.E., Saudi Arabia, Australia, America, New Zealand), are serving in the Pakistani army or are involved in farming.

http://wikimapia.org/#lat=33.0769423&lon=73.2317281&z=19&l=0&m=b

Populated places in Jhelum District